The 2011–12 Super League Greece was the 76th season of the highest football league of Greece and the sixth under the name Super League. The season began in late August or early September 2011 and ended in May 2012 with the last matches of the European playoff round. Olympiacos are the defending champions, having won their 38th Greek championship in the 2010–11 season.

The league comprised 13 teams from the 2010–11 season and three promoted teams from the 2010–11 Football League.

Teams
AEL, Panserraikos, Iraklis, Olympiacos Volos and Kavala were relegated at the end of the 2010–11 season. AEL and Panserraikos were relegated on virtue of their league position at the end of the season; AEL had to return to the Football League, formerly known as Beta Ethniki, after six seasons, while Panserraikos were relegated after just one season. Olympiacos Volos and Kavala were initially relegated to the Delta Ethniki due to the ongoing match-fixing scandal, but after an appeal, both teams demanded to have their cases rechecked. The Professional Sports Committee refused, however, and the original penalty stood. On 22 October 2011, almost two months after the league had started, they were replaced by Doxa Drama and Levadiakos.

Iraklis were denied a licence for the 2011–12 season over unpaid debts and put into last place of the league table. The club was thus demoted to the 2011–12 Football League, concluding a twenty-nine-year run in the highest football league of Greece. The demotion of Iraklis eventually spared Asteras Tripolis from relegation.

The three relegated teams have been replaced by 2010–11 Football League champions Panetolikos, runners-up PAS Giannina and OFI via a play-off round. Panetolikos returned to the Greek top football level after 34 seasons, while PAS Giannina made their immediate comeback to the Superleague.

The promotion play-off round, originally scheduled to take place in late May 2011, was postponed to late July 2011 after qualified teams OFI and Trikala were denied a licence for the 2011–12 season. The decision against OFI has since been reverted after the club successfully took the case to a civil court, enabling the side to compete in the play-offs along Levadiakos, Doxa Drama and Diagoras. OFI were eventually promoted as play-off winners after they were granted a walkover in their second-to-last match as their opponents Doxa Drama were not able to field a full side. The Heraklion club thus returned to the Super League after two seasons.

Stadiums and locations

Notes

Personnel and kits

Managerial changes

Regular season

League table

Results

Play-offs
In the play-off for Champions League, the four qualified teams play each other in a home and away round robin. However, they do not all start with 0 points. Instead, a weighting system applies to the teams' standing at the start of the play-off mini-league. The team finishing fifth in the Super League will start the play-off with 0 points. The fifth placed team's end of season tally of points is subtracted from the sum of the points that other teams have. This number is then divided by five.

Before the last round of matches, fifth-placed club AEK Athens earned 48 points during the regular season. Based on this number and the calculations above, Panathinaikos as runners-up began the play-offs with four points ((66–48)/5 = 3.6, rounded to 4) while PAOK and Atromitos started with zero points each ((50–48)/5 = 0.4, rounded to 0).

Season statistics

Top scorers
Updated to games played on 22 April 2012.

Top assists
Updated to games played on 22 April 2012.

Awards

Annual awards
Annual awards were announced on 14  January 2013

Player of the Year  

The Player of the Year awarded to  Kevin Mirallas (Olympiacos)

Foreign Player of the Year   

The Foreign Player of the Year awarded to  Kevin Mirallas (Olympiacos)

Top goalscorer of the Year  

The Top goalscorer of the Year awarded to  Kevin Mirallas (Olympiacos)

Greek Player of the Year  

The Greek Player of the Year awarded to  Kostas Mitroglou (Atromitos)

Manager of the Year  

The Manager of the Year awarded to  Ernesto Valverde (Olympiacos) and  Georgios Donis (Atromitos)

Young Player of the Year  

The Young Player of the Year awarded to  Panagiotis Vlachodimos (Xanthi)

Goalkeeper of the Year  

The Goalkeeper of the Year awarded to  Orestis Karnezis (Panathinaikos)

References

External links
Official website 

Super League Greece seasons
1
Greece